Boys Don't Cry is the second album by Rumer, produced by Steve Brown. It was released on 28 May 2012. The album is a selection of songs by artist/writers from the 1970s period. Rumer covers  works by male artists such as Jimmy Webb, Todd Rundgren, Terry Reid, Tim Hardin, Richie Havens, Gilbert O'Sullivan and others.

Reception

Kitty Empire  writing in The Observer praised the album - "it really does sound like another season in her soul" and called "Home Thoughts From Abroad" (by Clifford T. Ward) "the unexpected standout track."

Singles
 "P.F. Sloan" was the first single released from the album, it was released on 4 May 2012.

Track listing

Note that the track listing on the U.S. version is different and that the song "Andre Johray" by Tim Hardin is not included at all. Instead it includes the song "Welcome Back" by John Sebastian.

Charts

Weekly charts

Year-end charts

Certifications

Release history

References

2012 albums
Rumer (musician) albums
Atlantic Records albums
Covers albums